Live Shepperton 1980 is a 1982 album by The Damned, their first live album.

Background 
This recording was made live at a special gig played for the members of The Damned Fan Club at Shepperton, England in 1980.  Six of the tracks were originally released as side 4 of The Black Album in the UK. (Those tracks are Side One: 1-3 and Side Two: 2–4.)

Track listing 
All songs written by Rat Scabies, Captain Sensible, Dave Vanian and Algy Ward, except where noted.

Side One
"Love Song" - 2:10
"Second Time Around (Machine Gun Etiquette)"  - 1:41
"I Just Can’t Be Happy Today" (Rat Scabies, Captain Sensible, Dave Vanian, Algy Ward, Giovanni Dadomo) - 3:55
"Melody Lee" - 2:06
"Help!" (Lennon/McCartney) - 1:30
"Neat Neat Neat" (Brian James) - 4:37

Side Two
"Looking at You" (Michael Davis, Wayne Kramer, Fred "Sonic" Smith, Dennis Thompson, Rob Tyner) - 5:46
"Smash It Up (Parts 1 And 2)" - 4:22
"New Rose" (Brian James) - 1:48
"Plan 9 Channel 7" - 4:47

Personnel 
The Damned
Dave Vanian - lead vocals, keyboards
Captain Sensible - guitar, keyboards, backing vocals
Paul Gray - bass
Rat Scabies - drums

The Damned (band) live albums
1980 live albums